Alucita pepperella is a moth of the family Alucitidae. It is found on Rennell Island.

References

Moths described in 1962
Alucitidae
Moths of Oceania